Refund theft, also known as refund fraud, refund scam or whitehouse scam, is a crime which involves returning goods ineligible for refund to a retailer in exchange for money or other goods. The goods returned may have been acquired illegally, or they may be discarded damaged goods.  Other schemes involve sealing weights or other simulated merchandise in the original product packaging, or switching labels on items to purchase them at a lower price and then returning them for their original value.

Combating refund theft

While a popular scam in the past, refund theft has become much harder to accomplish due to digitalization.

Frequent returns
Many stores automatically flag a customer who returns over a certain number of items within a set amount of time. Footage of the flagged customer is reviewed by the Loss Prevention department, who will memorize the person's appearance and check to see if any thefts have been captured on video.

Section limit
In order to combat theft, in instances where store credit is given without a receipt, the credit can be "section limited". For example, if someone returns children's clothing without a receipt, they will be given a credit valid only for children's clothing.

Serial number
Some stores apply unique serial numbers to their items, embedded into the bar code or hidden elsewhere. If a serial number on an item to be returned does not match the serial number on the receipt, the store can refuse the refund. This technique is often applied to DVDs and video games, not only to prevent piracy but to prevent customers from simply obtaining a refund using a receipt and a similar item picked up in the store.

References

Theft